FabricLive.07 is a DJ mix compilation album by John Peel, as part of the FabricLive Mix Series.

Track listing

References

External links
Fabric: FabricLive.07
Allmusic: [ FabricLive.07 review]
Fabric Live Review by The Critique

John Peel albums
2002 compilation albums